The 122nd New York State Legislature, consisting of the New York State Senate and the New York State Assembly, met from January 4 to April 28, 1899, during the first year of Theodore Roosevelt's governorship, in Albany.

Background
Under the provisions of the New York Constitution of 1894, 50 Senators and 150 assemblymen were elected in single-seat districts; senators for a two-year term, assemblymen for a one-year term. The senatorial districts were made up of entire counties, except New York County (twelve districts), Kings County (seven districts), Erie County (three districts) and Monroe County (two districts). The Assembly districts were made up of contiguous area, all within the same county.

At this time there were two major political parties: the Republican Party and the Democratic Party. The Socialist Labor Party, the Prohibition Party and the Citizens Union also nominated tickets.

Elections
The New York state election, 1898 was held on November 8. Theodore Roosevelt was elected Governor; and Lt. Gov. Timothy L. Woodruff was re-elected; both Republicans. The other five statewide elective office up for election were also carried by the Republicans. The approximate party strength at this election, as expressed by the vote for Governor, was: Republican 662,000; Democratic 644,000; Socialist Labor 24,000; Prohibition 18,000; and Citizens Union 2,000.

Sessions
The Legislature met for the regular session at the State Capitol in Albany on January 4, 1899; and adjourned on April 28.

S. Frederick Nixon (R) was elected Speaker.

Timothy E. Ellsworth (R) was re-elected President pro tempore of the State Senate.

On January 17, the Legislature elected Chauncey M. Depew (R) to succeed Edward Murphy, Jr. (D) as U.S. Senator from New York, for a six-year term beginning on March 4, 1899.

State Senate

Districts

Note: In 1897, New York County (the boroughs of Manhattan and Bronx), Kings County (the borough of Brooklyn), Richmond County (the borough of Staten Island) and the Western part of Queens County (the borough of Queens) were consolidated into the present-day City of New York. The Eastern part of Queens County (the non-consolidated part) was separated in 1899 as Nassau County. Parts of the 1st and 2nd Assembly districts of Westchester County were annexed by New York City in 1895, and became part of the Borough of the Bronx in 1898.

Members
The asterisk (*) denotes members of the previous Legislature who continued in office as members of this Legislature. Thomas H. Cullen, David Floyd Davis, Henry Marshall, Thomas F. Donnelly, Richard H. Mitchell, William J. Graney, Louis F. Goodsell and William W. Armstrong changed from the Assembly to the Senate.

Employees
 Clerk: James S. Whipple
 Sergeant-at-Arms: Henry Jacquilard
 Doorkeeper: John E. Gorss
 Stenographer: A. B. Sackett

State Assembly

Assemblymen

Employees
 Clerk: Archie E. Baxter
 Assistant Clerk; Ray B. Smith
 Sergeant-at-Arms: James C. Crawford
 Doorkeeper: Frank W. Johnston
 First Assistant Doorkeeper: William H. Craig
 Second Assistant Doorkeeper: Charles R. Hotaling
 Stenographer: Henry C. Lammert

Notes

Sources
 Official New York from Cleveland to Hughes by Charles Elliott Fitch (Hurd Publishing Co., New York and Buffalo, 1911, Vol. IV; see pg. 340f for assemblymen; and 364 for senators)
 THE NEW LEGISLATURE in NYT on November 9, 1898
 THE NEXT LEGISLATURE; Revised Returns... in NYT on November 10, 1898
 CAUCUSES OF LEGISLATORS in NYT on January 4, 1899
 WORK OF THE ASSEMBLY in NYT on January 5, 1899

122
1899 in New York (state)
1899 U.S. legislative sessions